Mark Cendrowski is an American film and television director. He is best known as the director of most episodes of The Big Bang Theory.

Cendrowski is a 1981 graduate of the University of Michigan and a 1977 graduate of Notre Dame High School in Harper Woods, Michigan.

He has worked on a number of series, including directing many episodes of Yes, Dear, Still Standing, According to Jim, Rules of Engagement, and is the primary director of The Big Bang Theory. He has also directed episodes of Wizards of Waverly Place, The King of Queens, A.N.T. Farm, Hannah Montana, Sabrina, the Teenage Witch, The Hughleys, Malcolm & Eddie, Men at Work, Sullivan & Son, Dads, The Carmichael Show and Superior Donuts, among others.

Cendrowski received his first-ever Emmy nomination for Outstanding Directing for a Comedy Series for the final episode of the eleventh season of The Big Bang Theory, "The Bow Tie Asymmetry", which included special guest star Mark Hamill and another nomination for the series finale "The Stockholm Syndrome".

Cendrowski began his TV career as an assistant director and stage manager.

Filmography
data from IMDb

References

External links
 

American television directors
Living people
Place of birth missing (living people)
Year of birth missing (living people)
University of Michigan alumni